Mono 29 (stylized as MONO29) is a digital terrestrial television and satellite television channel in Thailand owned by MONO Next, a media and technology giant in Thailand.

History 

Mono 29 established in 2013 by a MONO Group subsidiary, MONO Broadcast, to start a business in digital terrestrial television. MONO Broadcast participated in the digital TV auction in late 2013 and won a licence with a bid of THB2,250 billion ($63 million).

Mono 29 launched on 25 April 2014 as a 24-hour channel offering foreign TV series and films from international studios such as Warner Bros., NBCUniversal and Paramount.

References

External links

Television stations in Thailand
Television channels and stations established in 2014